The Hunters is a 2013 American science fantasy adventure television film directed by Nisha Ganatra from a screenplay by Matthew Huffman and Jeffrey Schechter, based on the graphic novel Mirror Mirror by Joshua Williamson. The film stars Robbie Amell and Alexa Vega. It premiered on the Hallmark Channel on October 25, 2013.

Synopsis
Carter and Jordyn Flynn are not the average mother and father. For them, a typical workday can take place anywhere in the world, raiding ornate museums and evading pursuing authorities as Hunters, protectors of powerful fairytale artifacts that are anything but make-believe. While the Flynns take their jobs seriously, they're just as concerned about the welfare of their two sons, 21-year-old Paxton and 16-year-old Tripp, who are unaware of their parents' true line of work.

When Carter and Jordyn disappear after being intercepted by the mysterious Mai during one of their missions, the boys learn the truth about their parents and their lineage from the Flynns’ young assistant Dylan. They turn to old family friend Mason for help, but they soon discover that the deceitful Mason is after what the Flynns were trying to protect—an enchanted mirror that has the ability to grant any wish. It has quite a history too: It is the same mirror that played a pivotal role in the destiny of Snow White. It becomes evident that it is up to the valiant brothers and Dylan to save the day before very real fairy tale magic falls into Mason’s less-than-worthy hands.

Cast
 Robbie Amell as Paxton Flynn
 Alexa Vega as Dylan Savini
 Victor Garber as Mason Fuller
 Kira Clavell (born 20.08.1979) as Mai
 Michelle Forbes as Jordan Flynn
 Dan Payne as Carter Flynn
 Keenan Tracey (born 22.07.1991) as Tripp Flynn

Production
The film was shot in Vancouver, British Columbia with additional shooting done in Thailand.

References

External links
 
 

2013 television films
2013 films
2013 fantasy films
2013 science fiction films
2010s fantasy adventure films
2010s science fiction adventure films
Adventure television films
American fantasy adventure films
American science fantasy films
American science fiction adventure films
Fantasy television films
Films based on American comics
Films shot in Vancouver
Hallmark Channel original films
Live-action films based on comics
American science fiction television films
Television shows based on comics
2010s English-language films
2010s American films